Stanley Girard Schlarman (born July 27, 1933) is an American prelate of the Roman Catholic Church. He served as bishop of the Diocese of Dodge City in Kansas from 1983 to 1998 and as an auxiliary bishop of the Diocese of Belleville in Illinois from 1979 to 1983.

Biography

Early life 
Stanley Schlarman was born on July 27, 1933, in Belleville, Illinois, to Cletus and Dorothy (née Lindow) Schlarman. His great-uncle, Bishop Joseph H. Schlarman, served as bishop of the Bishop of Peoria from 1930 to 1951. Stanley Schlarman attended St. Henry's Preparatory Seminary in Belleville before furthering his studies at the Pontifical Gregorian University in Rome.

Priesthood 
Schlarman was ordained to the priesthood for the Diocese of Belleville in Rome by Archbishop Luigi Traglia on July 13, 1958.After returning to Illinois, Schlarman served as a teacher, guidance counselor, and principal at Mater Dei High School in Breese, Illinois. During his tenure at the high school, he was also a part-time associate pastor, director of the Don Bosco Latin School for prospective seminarians in Chicago, and pastor of a small parish.

Schlarman obtained his Master of Education degree, with a concentration on counseling and guidance, from St. Louis University in St. Louis, Missouri. He also attended Southern Illinois University in Edwardsville, Illinois. After serving as chaplain to a local Catholic hospital, Schlarman became a pastor in St. Rose Township, Illinois, and later in Cairo, Illinois.

While still at Mater Dei, Schlarman did catechetical work and ministered to mentally and physically challenged children at the Warren G. Murray Developmental Center in Centralia, Illinois. He was the founding director of the Teens Encounter Christ (TEC) program in the diocese a member of the diocesan mediation board, the Priests Personnel Board, and the Senate of Priests.

Episcopal career

Auxiliary Bishop of Belleville
On March 13, 1979, Pope John Paul II appointed Schlarman as an auxiliary bishop of the Diocese of Belleville and titular bishop of Capreae.  He was consecrated on May 14, 1979 by Bishop William Cosgrove, with Bishops Albert Zuroweste and Philip Murphy serving as co-consecrators, at the Cathedral of Saint Peter in Belleville He selected as his episcopal motto, "Who Is A Rock But Our God" from Psalms 18:31.

Bishop of Dodge City
On March 1, 1983, Pope John Paul II appointed Schlarman as the fourth bishop of the Diocese of Dodge City. He was installed on May 4, 1983 at the Dodge City Civic Center.During his tenure in Dodge City, Schlarman recruited Burmese, Filipino, and Vietnamese priests; established a diocesan Vocations Office, a pastoral council, an Office of Aging and Parenting; and promoted the Pastoral Ministry Training Program and Cursillo movement.

Retirement 
When Schlarman reached the mandatory retirement age of 75, he sent his letter of resignation as bishop of Dodge City to Pope John Paul II.  The pope accepted it 12, 1998 and appointed Schlarman as apostolic administrator of the diocese until the installation of his successor, Monsignor Ronald M. Gilmore.  On June 2, 2015, Schlarman resigned as vicar general for the diocese.

In 2003, Schlarman was appointed vicar for priests at Joliet Correctional Center in Joliet, Illinois.  In 2006, he assumed the same role at Menard Correctional Center in Chester, Illinois.

See also
 

 Catholic Church hierarchy
 Catholic Church in the United States
 Historical list of the Catholic bishops of the United States
 List of Catholic bishops of the United States
 Lists of patriarchs, archbishops, and bishops

References

External links
Roman Catholic Diocese of Dodge City Official Site

1933 births
Living people
Pontifical Gregorian University alumni
American people of German descent
People from Belleville, Illinois
20th-century Roman Catholic bishops in the United States
Saint Louis University alumni
Southern Illinois University alumni
Roman Catholic bishops of Dodge City
Roman Catholic Diocese of Belleville
Religious leaders from Illinois
Catholics from Illinois